Hook Shipyards F.C. was an English football club.

History
The club joined the Yorkshire League in 1921. They finished 15th out of 17 clubs and resigned from the competition after a single season.

References

Defunct football clubs in England
Defunct football clubs in the East Riding of Yorkshire
Works association football teams in England